The chromatic scale (or twelve-tone scale) is a set of twelve pitches (more completely, pitch classes) used in tonal music, with notes separated by the interval of a semitone. Chromatic instruments, such as the piano, are made to produce the chromatic scale, while other instruments capable of continuously variable pitch, such as the trombone and violin, can also produce microtones, or notes between those available on a piano.

Most music uses subsets of the chromatic scale such as diatonic scales. While the chromatic scale is fundamental in western music theory, it is seldom directly used in its entirety in musical compositions or improvisation.

Definition
The chromatic scale is a musical scale with twelve pitches, each a semitone, also known as a half-step, above or below its adjacent pitches. As a result, in 12-tone equal temperament (the most common tuning in Western music), the chromatic scale covers all 12 of the available pitches. Thus, there is only one chromatic scale.

In equal temperament, all the semitones have the same size (100 cents), and there are twelve semitones in an octave (1200 cents). As a result, the notes of an equal-tempered chromatic scale are equally-spaced.

The ascending and descending chromatic scale is shown below.

Notation

The chromatic scale has no set enharmonic spelling that is always used. Its spelling is, however, often dependent upon major or minor key signatures and whether the scale is ascending or descending. In general, the chromatic scale is usually notated with sharp signs when ascending and flat signs when descending. It is also notated so that no scale degree is used more than twice in succession (for instance, G – G – G).

Similarly, some notes of the chromatic scale have enharmonic equivalents in solfege. The rising scale is Do, Di, Re, Ri, Mi, Fa, Fi, Sol, Si, La, Li, Ti and the descending is Ti, Te/Ta, La, Le/Lo, Sol, Se, Fa, Mi, Me/Ma, Re, Ra, Do, However, once 0 is given to a note, due to octave equivalence, the chromatic scale may be indicated unambiguously by the numbers 0-11 mod twelve. Thus two perfect fifths are 0-7-2. Tone rows, orderings used in the twelve-tone technique, are often considered this way due to the increased ease of comparing inverse intervals and forms (inversional equivalence).

Pitch-rational tunings

Pythagorean

The most common conception of the chromatic scale before the 13th century was the Pythagorean chromatic scale. Due to a different tuning technique, the twelve semitones in this scale have two slightly different sizes. Thus, the scale is not perfectly symmetric. Many other tuning systems, developed in the ensuing centuries, share a similar asymmetry.

In Pythagorean tuning (i.e. 3-limit just intonation) the chromatic scale is tuned as follows, in perfect fifths from G to A centered on D (in bold) (G–D–A–E–B–F–C–G–D–A–E–B–F–C–G–D–A), with sharps higher than their enharmonic flats (cents rounded to one decimal):

{| class="wikitable" style="text-align: center"
|-
!width=4%|
!width=4%| C 
!width=4%| D 
!width=4%| C 
!width=4%| D 
!width=4%| E
!width=4%| D 
!width=4%| E 
!width=4%| F 
!width=4%| G
!width=4%| F
!width=4%| G 
!width=4%| A 
!width=4%| G
!width=4%| A 
!width=4%| B
!width=4%| A
!width=4%| B
!width=4%| C
|-
!Pitchratio
| 1 ||  ||  ||  ||  ||  ||  ||  ||  ||  ||  ||  ||  ||  ||  ||  ||  || 2
|-
!Cents
| 0 || 90.2 || 113.7 || 203.9 || 294.1 || 317.6 || 407.8 || 498 || 588.3 || 611.7 || 702 || 792.2 || 815.6 || 905.9 || 996.1 || 1019.6 || 1109.8 || 1200
|}

The chromatic scale in Pythagorean tuning can be tempered to the 17-EDO tuning (P5 = 10 steps = 705.88 cents).

Just intonation

In 5-limit just intonation the chromatic scale, Ptolemy's intense chromatic scale, is as follows, with flats higher than their enharmonic sharps, and new notes between E–F and B–C (cents rounded to one decimal):

{| class="wikitable" style="text-align: center"
|-
!
! C !! C !! D !! D !! D !! E !! E !! E/F !! F !! F !! G !! G !! G !! A !! A !! A !! B !! B !! B/C !! C
|-
!Pitch ratio
| 1 ||  ||  ||  ||  ||  ||  ||  ||  ||  ||  ||  ||  ||  ||  ||  ||  ||  ||  || 2
|-
!Cents
| 0 || 70.7 || 111.7 || 203.9 || 274.6 || 315.6 || 386.3 || 427.4 || 498 || 568.7 || 631.3 || 702 || 772.6 || 813.7 || 884.4 || 955 || 1017.6 || 1088.3 || 1129.3 || 1200
|}

Just intonation tuning can be approximated by 19-EDO tuning (P5 = 11 steps = 694.74 cents).

Non-Western cultures
The ancient Chinese chromatic scale is called Shí-èr-lǜ. However, "it should not be imagined that this gamut ever functioned as a scale, and it is erroneous to refer to the 'Chinese chromatic scale', as some Western writers have done. The series of twelve notes known as the twelve lü were simply a series of fundamental notes from which scales could be constructed." However, "from the standpoint of tonal music [the chromatic scale] is not an independent scale, but derives from the diatonic scale," making the Western chromatic scale a gamut of fundamental notes from which scales could be constructed as well.

See also
Atonality
Chromaticism
Twelve-tone technique
20th century music#Classical
"All Through the Night" (Cole Porter song)

Notes

Sources

Further reading
Hewitt, Michael. 2013. Musical Scales of the World. The Note Tree.

External links
The Chromatic Scale arranged for guitar in several fingerings. (Formatted for easy printing)
 The 12 golden notes of music
 Chromatic Scale – Analysis

Chromaticism
Musical scales
Post-tonal music theory
Musical symmetry
Hemitonic scales
Tritonic scales